LGBT Pride Month is a month, typically in June, dedicated to celebration and commemoration of lesbian, gay, bisexual, and transgender (LGBT) pride. Pride Month began after the Stonewall riots, a series of gay liberation protests in 1969, and has since spread outside of the United States. Modern-day Pride Month both honors the movement for LGBT rights and celebrates LGBT culture.

History

Origins 

The concept of Pride Month began with the Stonewall riots, a series of riots for gay liberation that took place beginning on June 28, 1969. The riots began after a police raid at the Stonewall Inn, a gay bar located within Lower Manhattan in New York City. Activists Marsha P. Johnson, Sylvia Rivera, and Stormé DeLarverie are credited for inciting the riots, though Johnson disputes her involvement.

The year after the riots, the first pride marches were held in several US cities. The march in New York City, aimed to celebrate the "Christopher Street Liberation Day", alongside parallel marches across the US, is considered to be a watershed moment for LGBT rights. Fred Sargeant, an organizer of some of the first marches, said that the goal was to commemorate the Stonewall riots and further push for liberation. He noted that while the first marches were more akin to a protest than a celebration, it helped to remind people of LGBT communities and how they may include one's family and friends. However, transgender women and people of color were noted to have been excluded or silenced during the early marches, despite the initial riots largely consisting of them.

Spread and celebration 
Following the Stonewall riots and the first pride marches, the amount of LGBT groups rapidly increased, and the pride movement spread across the United States after a few years. As of 2020, most pride celebrations in major urban areas around the world are held in June, although some cities hold them at different times of the year partially because of the weather in June being suboptimal for such events there.

Recognition 
In June 1999, US President Bill Clinton declared "the anniversary of [the] Stonewall [riots] every June in America as Gay and Lesbian Pride Month". In 2011, President Barack Obama expanded the officially recognized Pride Month to include the whole of the LGBT community. In 2017, however, Donald Trump declined to continue the federal recognition of Pride Month in the United States, though he later recognized it in 2019 in a Tweet later used as a Presidential Proclamation. After taking office in 2021, Joe Biden recognized Pride Month and vowed to push for LGBT rights in the United States, despite previously voting against same-sex marriage and school education of LGBT topics in the Senate.

In addition, Pride Month is often observed in several LGBT-affirming religious congregations.

Criticism 

Some have criticized how many companies release Pride Month-themed products, likening it to the concept of "slacktivism", as the companies are perceived to be using the topic of LGBT rights as a means of profit, without contributing to the movement in a meaningful way. Others have criticized the seemingly hypocritical nature of companies making social media profiles evoke the rainbow pride flag while refusing to alter the profile pictures in areas without broad LGBT acceptance.

Variants 
In 2018, an internet meme circulated surrounding the concept of a "wrath month", a play on pride and wrath both being part of the seven deadly sins of Christianity, to take place in July following the end of Pride Month.

References 

Commemorative months
LGBT pride
June observances